The year 2010 is the 3rd year in the history of Jewels, a mixed martial arts promotion based in Japan. In 2010 Jewels held 6 events beginning with, Jewels - Rough Stone: Second Ring.

Title fights

Events list

Jewels - Rough Stone: Second Ring

Jewels - Rough Stone: Second Ring was an event held on January 31, 2010 at Caesar Gym Shin-Koiwa in Tokyo, Japan.

Results

Jewels 7th Ring

Jewels 7th Ring was an event held on March 19, 2010 at Shinjuku Face in Tokyo, Japan.

Results

Jewels 8th Ring

Jewels 8th Ring was an event held on May 23, 2010 at Shin-Kiba 1st Ring in Tokyo, Japan.

Results

Jewels 9th Ring

Jewels 9th Ring was an event held on July 31, 2010 at Shinjuku Face in Tokyo, Japan.

Results

Jewels 10th Ring

Jewels 10th Ring was an event held on October 10, 2010 at Shin-Kiba 1st Ring in Tokyo, Japan.

Results

Jewels 11th Ring

Jewels 11th Ring was an event held on December 17, 2010 at Korakuen Hall in Tokyo, Japan.

Results

See also 
 Jewels

References

Jewels (mixed martial arts) events
2010 in mixed martial arts